The Women's combined competition of the Nagano 1998  Olympics was held at Hakuba. The downhill was originally scheduled before the slalom runs, but weather delays meant that the slalom runs were the first.
The defending world champion was Renate Goetschl of Italy, while Sweden's Pernilla Wiberg was the defending World Cup combined champion.

Results

References 

Women's combined
Olymp
Women's events at the 1998 Winter Olympics